An elliptical wing is a wing planform whose leading and trailing edges each approximate two segments of an ellipse. It is not to be confused with annular wings, which may be elliptically shaped.

Relatively few aircraft have adopted the elliptical wing, an even-smaller number of which attained mass production; the majority of aircraft that did use this feature were introduced during the 1930s and 1940s. Perhaps the most famous aircraft to feature an elliptical wing is the Supermarine Spitfire, a Second World War-era British fighter aircraft. Another major application was the Heinkel He 70 "Blitz", a German fast mail plane and reconnaissance bomber; early versions of the He 111 bomber also used such a wing configuration before a simpler design was adopted for economic reasons.

Properties
Theoretically, the most efficient way to create lift is to generate it in an elliptical spanwise distribution across the wing. There is no inherent superiority to pure elliptical shapes, and wings with other planforms can be optimized to give elliptical spanwise lift distributions.

The basic elliptical wing shape also has disadvantages:
 The almost uniform lift distribution of a constant-aerofoil section elliptical wing can cause the entire span of the wing to stall simultaneously, potentially causing loss of control with little warning. To improve the stalling characteristics and give the pilot some warning, designers use a non-uniform aerofoil. For example, the wing of the Supermarine Spitfire was both thinned towards the tips and twisted to give washout, reducing the load on the tips so that the inner wing would stall first. Such compromises depart from the theoretical elliptical lift distribution, increasing induced drag. An elliptical spanwise lift distribution cannot be achieved by an untwisted wing with an elliptical planform because there is a logarithmic term in the lift distribution that becomes important near the wing tips. 

Elliptical wing planforms are more difficult to manufacture. In it, either leading edge or trailing edge or both are curved, and the ribs change in a non uniform way along the wingspan. In practice, most elliptical wings are approximations, for example several sections of the Spitfire leading and trailing edges are arcs of circles.

The semi-elliptical wing
For a wing to have an elliptical area distribution, it is not necessary for both the leading and trailing edges to be curved. If one of these is straight, as in the semi-elliptical planform, the wing may still have an elliptical area distribution. Several aircraft of this type have been produced; one of the most successful being the American Seversky P-35.

During the postwar era, the semi-elliptical wing profile was extensively studied for its ground effect properties; it was postulated that it would be suitable for ground-effect vehicles (which operate close to the water, in ground effect, to avoid the higher induced drag that occurs out of ground effect). The low level of induced drag produced by a semi-elliptical wing would be beneficial for these vehicles.

History
The British theoretical aerodynamicist Frederick Lanchester was perhaps the first person to write in detail about the elliptical wing, having done so during 1907. Ludwig Prandtl independently rediscovered this in 1917–1918. Despite this early head-start, the elliptical wing was initially viewed as more a theoretical concept than one for practical application, in part due to the overriding needs to compromise between an aircraft aerodynamic properties and its other design aspects. It would be quite some time before practical use of the planform would be made.

The first aircraft to use the elliptical wing was the Bäumer Sausewind, a German light sports aircraft that performed its maiden flight on 26 May 1925. Its designers, the Günther brothers, would subsequently join the German aircraft manufacturer Heinkel and apply their designs, including the elliptical wing, to several different projects undertaken by the firm. During the early 1930s, Heinkel developed a fast mail plane and reconnaissance bomber, the Heinkel He 70 "Blitz", which featured the elliptical wing. It proved to have excellent performance for the era, establishing eight individual world records relating to speed over distance, having reportedly attained a maximum speed of 377 km/h (222 mph).

Shortly thereafter, Heinkel developed the He 111 bomber, which made its first flight on 24 February 1935. In comparison to the preceding He 70, it was a larger aircraft that initially masqueraded as a civil airliner despite having been developed from conception to provide the nascent Luftwaffe with a fast medium bomber; this deception was due to restrictions placed on Germany after the First World War that prohibited the development or deployment of bomber aircraft. Despite the type being produced in vast numbers before and during the Second World War, only the early production models of the He 111 were equipped with an elliptical wing. The chief reason for dropping the He 111's elliptical wing in favour of one with straight leading and trailing edges was economic, the latter design could be manufactured with greater efficiency.

Perhaps the aircraft company most commonly associated with the elliptical wing was the British manufacturer Supermarine. During the early 1920s, the company's chief designer, Reginald Mitchell, had developed the Supermarine S.4, a British elliptical wing racing seaplane; it conducted its first flight during 1924. While the S.4's direct successors featured a wing designed by a different designer, Mitchell remained a proponent of the planform. By 1934, Mitchell and his design staff were engaged in designing a new fighter aircraft for the Royal Air Force. They decided to use a semi-elliptical wing shape to solve two conflicting requirements; the wing needed to be thin to allow a high critical Mach number but it had to be thick enough to house the retractable undercarriage, armament, and ammunition. An elliptical planform is the most efficient aerodynamic shape for an untwisted wing, leading to the lowest amount of induced drag. The semi-elliptical planform was skewed so that the centre of pressure, which occurs near the quarter-chord position at all but the highest speeds, was close to the main spar, preventing the wings from twisting. The Spitfire conducted its maiden flight on 5 March 1936.

Mitchell has sometimes been accused of copying the wing shape of Heinkel's He 70. Communications between Ernest Heinkel and Mitchell during the 1930s establishes Mitchell's awareness of the He 70 and its performance. However, Beverley Shenstone, the aerodynamicist on Mitchell's team, observed that: "Our wing was much thinner and had quite a different section to that of the Heinkel. In any case, it would have been simply asking for trouble to have copied a wing shape from an aircraft designed for an entirely different purpose."

Almost all Republic P-47 Thunderbolts, an American fighter aircraft, were outfitted with elliptical wings; only the last production models different, instead featuring squared-off wingtips, akin to the low-altitude Spitfire variants. The Aichi D3A, a Japanese dive bomber operated by the Imperial Japanese Navy, also used an elliptical wing that bore considerable similarity to that of the He 70. The Mitsubishi A5M fighter also utilized an elliptical wing design. Several other types had planforms which differed relatively little from the elliptical. The Hawker Tempest II fighter aircraft, which later developed into the Hawker Fury and Hawker Sea Fury, also utilised a near-eliptical wing planform, although squared off at the tips.

Since 2009, the British aircraft company Swift Aircraft have been reportedly developing a two-seater Very Light Aircraft, Light-sport aircraft and CS-23 category aircraft, the Swift Aircraft Swift, which features elliptical wings.

References

Citations

Bibliography 

 Clancy, L. J. Aerodynamics. Pitman Publishing Limited, London. 1975. .

 Ethell, Jeffrey L. and Steve Pace. Spitfire. St. Paul, Minnesota: Motorbooks International, 1997. .
 Francillon, René J. Japanese Aircraft of the Pacific War. London: Putnam & Company Ltd., 1970 (2nd edition 1979). .
 Glancey, Jonathan. Spitfire: The Illustrated Biography. London: Atlantic Books, 2006. .
 
 Mason, Francis K. The Hawker Tempest I–IV (Aircraft in Profile Number 197). Leatherhead, Surrey, UK: Profile Publications Ltd., 1967. 
 McCormick, Barnes W. Aerodynamics, Aeronautics, and Flight Mechanics. John Wiley & Sons, New York, 1979. . pp. 135–139.
 Milne-Thomson, L.M. Theoretical Aerodynamics, 4th Ed., Dover Publications Inc, New York, 1966/1973. . pp. 208–209.
 Price, Alfred. The Spitfire Story: Revised second edition. Enderby, Leicester, UK: Siverdale Books, 2002. .
 
 Thomas, Chris and Christopher Shores. The Typhoon and Tempest Story. London: Arms and Armour Press, 1988. .

External links
 The Spitfire Wing Planform: A Suggestion via aerosociety.com
 Induced Drag Coefficient via grc.nasa.gov

Aircraft wing design
Wing configurations